

Nathaniel Dearborn (1786–1852) was an engraver in 19th-century Boston, Massachusetts. He was born in New England in 1786 to inventor Benjamin Dearborn; siblings included John M. Dearborn and Fanny Dearborn Hanman. In Boston he learned engraving from Abel Bowen. By 1814 Dearborn worked from quarters on School Street; later moving to Market Street (ca.1823), State Street (ca.1826-1831) and Washington Street (ca.1832–1852). Around 1830, he also gave musical lessons on the flute.

He died November 7, 1852, in South Reading. His son, Nathaniel S. Dearborn, continued as an engraver and printer in Boston, working on Water Street (ca.1847–1851) and School Street (ca.1857-1868). N.S. Dearborn exhibited several printed specimens in the 1850 exhibition of the Massachusetts Charitable Mechanic Association. His grandson S.B. Dearborn also worked as a printer.

Works by Dearborn
 Views from the Mass. State House, Boston. ca.1838.
 American Textbook for Letters. 1842.
 Boston Notions; an Account of That Village from 1630 to 1847. 1848
 Dearborn's Reminiscences of Boston, and Guide through the City and Environs. 1851
 Dearborn's Guide through Mount Auburn. 1857

References

Images

External links

 WorldCat. Dearborn, Nathaniel 1786-1852

1786 births
1852 deaths
American engravers
Artists from Boston
19th-century American people